Victory Theme is a Brazilian instrumental song composed specially for the broadcast of Formula One by Rede Globo. The music was composed by Eduardo Souto Neto.

History 
The song was suggested by Aloysio Legey, the director of Formula One transmissions for Rede Globo. The song was recorded in 1981 by the Brazilian band Roupa Nova, to be used as the soundtrack of victories in the Brazilian Grand Prix, regardless of the winner's nationality, transmitted by Rede Globo. The song was first performed with the victory of Nelson Piquet in the 1983 Brazilian Grand Prix. The next year, the song was performed for Alain Prost's victory in the 1984 Brazilian Grand Prix.

It was only in 1986 that the song started to be used for every victory by a Brazilian driver. The song marked Nelson Piquet's achievement of third championship in 1987 and Ayrton Senna's championships in 1988, 1990 and 1991.

For seven years the song wasn't played on Rede Globo due to the lack of victories by Brazilian drivers, between the 1993 Australian Grand Prix won by Ayrton Senna and the 2000 German Grand Prix won by Rubens Barrichello.

In 2006, the song was played the first time for Felipe Massa for his victory in the 2006 Turkish Grand Prix.

The Victory Theme was also played on Rede Globo after the Brazilian national team won the 1994 FIFA World Cup, as an homage to Ayrton Senna, who died earlier that year. and again in the 2002 FIFA World Cup, where Brazil won the World Cup trophy for the 5th time in Japan.

In 2009, the victory theme was played but with a different arrangement for Rubens Barrichello's victory in the 2009 European Grand Prix, which marked Brazil's 100th victory in the history of Formula One; no Brazilian driver has won a race since Barrichello claimed victory at that year's Italian Grand Prix two races later.

At UFC 198, UFC Heavyweight Champion Fabricio Werdum used the song as his entrance music.

On March 29, 2014, the guitarist of the American band Guns N' Roses performed the song "Tema da Vitória" at a concert in São Paulo. In that week, if he were alive, Senna would have been 54 years old.

References

External links 

 
 

Brazilian music
1981 songs
Motorsport in Brazil
Formula One mass media
Sporting songs